Tremont Baptist Church is a historic Baptist church in the Bronx, New York City. The church was built in two phases between 1904 and 1912.  It is a one-story building above a raised basement in the Late Gothic Revival style.  It is 50 feet tall with a 75 foot tall offset corner tower.  It is faced in gray marble, and features buttressed bays, pointed arch door and window openings, a high-pitched gable roof, and stained glass windows.

It was added to the National Register of Historic Places in 2009.

See also
List of New York City Designated Landmarks in The Bronx
National Register of Historic Places in Bronx County, New York

References

External links
 Tremont Baptist Church website
 New York City American Guild of Organists: Tremont Baptist Church

Episcopal church buildings in New York City
Properties of religious function on the National Register of Historic Places in the Bronx
Gothic Revival church buildings in New York City
Churches completed in 1912
Churches in the Bronx
New York City Designated Landmarks in the Bronx
1912 establishments in New York City